Andreas Gianniotis (born 18 December 1992) is a Greek professional footballer who plays as a goalkeeper for Super League club Atromitos.

Club career
Gianniotis joined Olympiacos from Football League 2 side Ethnikos Gazoros on 22 June 2012 after impressive league performances in the 2011–12 Football League 2.

He joined Fostiras on loan in January 2014. He joined PAS Giannina on loan in August 2014. He joined Olympiacos in January 2015. He joined Panionios on loan for two years in summer 2015. His performances during the last two years, was his passport to be called by Skibbe for the crucial game against Bosnia which will held in Zenica on 9 June.

On summer 2017, the administration of Olympiacos wants to extend the current contract of talented goalkeeper, which expires in the summer of 2019. The 24-year-old player spent the last two seasons on loan to Panionios, with more than 35 performances for all competitions, while the Reds are planning to extend his current contract until the summer of 2021.

On 1 September 2017, after the acquisition of ex-international goalie Silvio Proto, Giannotis is not in the season plans of Albanian manager of the Reds, Besnik Hasi, and he solved his contract with the club, in order to find more playing time. On 4 September 2017, Atromitos officially announced the signing of goalkeeper Andreas Gianniotis, who was recently released from Olympiacos, until the end of 2018–19 season. On 4 November 2017, in a goalless home Superleague draw game against rivals Panionios, Giannotis kept a 8 in a row clean sheets, entered as the new no.7 at the Top 10 of all time performances for the Greek championship.

On 29 May 2018, Gianniotis returned to Olympiacos on a trade deal with Atromitos. Olympiacos will activate the return clause in Gianniotis’ current contract with Atromitos and instead of paying them €300,000 for the player, Olympiacos will give Spyros Risvanis on a free transfer in exchange for the goalkeeper. On 9 August 2018, he made his international debut in a 4–0 home win UEFA Europa League Third qualifying round, 1st leg game against FC Luzern.

On 5 June 2019, Gianniotis signed a three-year contract with champions Maccabi Tel Aviv which included an option to extend his stay by a further year for an estimated €500,000 fee per year. He started as the undisputed first goalie of the club, gaining his first title as a starter in a 1–0 2019 Israel Super Cup game against Bnei Yehuda Tel Aviv, but on 18 August 2019 he suffered a ruptured sideband in the ankle in the semifinal Toto Cup Al game against Hapoel Ironi Kiryat Shmona.

On 6 August 2020, Gianniotis returned to Atromitos on a season-long loan from Maccabi Tel Aviv. In the 2020/21 season, Gianniotis made 18 league appearances and kept 6 clean sheets.

On 30 June 2021, Gianniotis returned to Maccabi Tel Aviv after his one season loan with Atromitos had come to an end.

International career
On 16 March 2018, he was called in the Greece national team from Michael Skibbe for the friendly matches against Switzerland on 23 March 2018 and Egypt on 27 March 2018. On 27 March 2018, he made his debut in the Greece national team against Egypt as a starter.

Career statistics
As of 11 December 2021:

Notes

Honours

Club
Olympiacos
Super League Greece: 2012–13, 2014–15
Greek Cup: 2014–15
Maccabi Tel-Aviv 
Israeli Premier League: 2019–20
Israel State Cup: 2019–20
Israel Super Cup: 2019

Individual
 Super League Greece Goalkeeper of the Year: 2016–17, 2017–18    
 Super League Greece Team of the Year: 2016–17, 2017–18

References

External links
 
Myplayer.gr Profile
superleaguegreece.net profile 

1992 births
Living people
Association football goalkeepers
Greek footballers
Greece under-21 international footballers
Greece international footballers
Greek expatriate footballers
Olympiacos F.C. players
Panionios F.C. players
PAS Giannina F.C. players
Fostiras F.C. players
Maccabi Tel Aviv F.C. players
Atromitos F.C. players
Super League Greece players
Football League (Greece) players
Israeli Premier League players
Expatriate footballers in Israel
Greek expatriate sportspeople in Israel
Footballers from Serres